The United States ambassador to Fiji is the official representative of the government of the United States to the government of Fiji. The ambassador is concurrently the ambassador to Kiribati, Nauru, Tonga, and Tuvalu, while residing in Suva, Fiji.

Ambassadors

See also
Fiji – United States relations
Foreign relations of Fiji
Ambassadors of the United States

References
United States Department of State: Background notes on Fiji

External links
 United States Department of State: Chiefs of Mission for Fiji
 United States Department of State: Fiji
 United States Embassy in Fiji

 
Fiji
United States